Right to die may refer to:

Right to die, the decision about who should let an individual die 
Right to Die (film), a 1987 television drama
Right to Die?, a 2008 television documentary
Right to Die (Masters of Horror), a 2007 released episode of the television series Masters of Horror
 A Right to Die, a 1964 Nero Wolfe detective novel by Rex Stout